Novishki is a rural locality (a village) in Denisovskoye Rural Settlement, Gorokhovetsky District, Vladimir Oblast, Russia. The population was 89 as of 2010.

Geography 
Novishki is located 28 km southwest of Gorokhovets (the district's administrative centre) by road. Proletarsky is the nearest rural locality.

References 

Rural localities in Gorokhovetsky District